Újpesti TE created a fencing section in 1922, which had one of the most successful teams in Hungary.

Achievements

Current squad

Technical and Managerial Staff
Fencing team officials according to the official website:

Athletes

Men's squad

Women's squad

Fencing Hall
Name: UTE Vívócsarnok
City: Budapest, Hungary
Address: H-1077 Budapest, VII. district, Király u. 71.

International success

Olympic medalists

The team's olympic medalists are shown below.

World Championships

European Championships

Notable former fencers

Sabre
 Endre Kabos 
 Imre Gedővári
 Zoltán Nagyházi
 László Csongrádi 
 Bence Szabó
 Csaba Köves
 József Navarrete
 Péter Abay

Épée
 Pál B. Nagy
 Zoltán Székely

Foil
 Paula Marosi
 Ildikó Újlaky-Rejtő
 Mária Szolnoki
 Gertrúd Stefanek
 Ildikó Pusztai

See also
Hungarian Fencer of the Year

References

External links
Fencing section website 
Official Újpesti TE website 

fencing
Újpesti TE
Sports clubs established in 1922
Fencing clubs